Class 87 may refer to:

British Rail Class 87, a class of British electric locomotives
DRG Class 87, a class of standard German 0-10-0T steam locomotive